Bomberman B-Daman Bakugaiden Victory or  is a Coro Coro Comic series by Koichi Mikata, based on Bomberman and B-Daman. The animated television series is broadcast on Nagoya TV. V stands for "Victory" but the anime is also based on the 5th BB-daman manga.

Characters

B-DaCop
Shirobon (White Bomber): A B-da Cop who travels through space and time to protect peace in the world.  He is determined but a bit childish at times.
Aobon (Blue Bomber): Shirobon's partner.  He is very shy and timid, but always pulls through in the end to save his friends.
Kurobon (Black Bomber): An elite B-da Cop who is very independent and acts on his own.  He often comes in at critical times to save the other B-da Cops and then disappears as quickly as he came. He also has a number of shining medals, and is said to be the "uncrowned king".
Akabon (Red Bomber): She is the princess of Border Kingdom.  After Devil Vader attacks her country she is saved by the B-da Cops Shirobon and Aobon.  She later joins them as a B-da Cop to stop Devil Vader and save her kingdom.
Kiirobon (Yellow Bomber): A Kansai speaking shipping carrier who dreams of becoming a B-da Cop.  While he waits to become one, he assists the others in their battles against dark B-da.
Midoribon (Green Bomber): A soldier from Border Kingdom who was stranded on an island.  After being rescued by the B-da Cops, he joins forces with them to save Border Kingdom. He is very dedicated to Akabon and is willing to die for her.
Graybon Hakase (Professor Gray Bomber): A genius scientist who builds new armors for the B-da Cop.
Mimitan: A bat-like animal who is Graybon Hakase's assistant.

Devilvader
Akumantle:A mustached villain. For a while, the only one with a mecha of his own, but Docdandy and Gestler both obtain mechas as well in Episode 20. His Mecha resembles an scorpion.
Docdandy:A rather girly villain who likes pretty things, dislikes Kiirobon and has a crush on Kurobon. His mecha resembles a bee.
Devil Slinger: A very experienced Devilvader who seems to resemble a gunslinger. He and Kurobon are rivals.
Gestra:A chubby villain who is the brains of his trio, formed by him, Akumantle and Docdandy.
King Vader: The demon-like Devilvader leader.

Others
Geniusbon
Witchy
Carrierbon
Bestbon
B-DaMaster
B-Da King

External links
The B-Daman Wiki Forums, a community dedicated to B-Daman
 

1999 anime television series debuts
B-Daman
Bomberman anime and manga
Japan-exclusive video games
Konami franchises
Madhouse (company)
Manga (year of release missing)
Shogakukan franchises
Shōnen manga
Takara Tomy franchises
Comics based on toys
Television shows based on toys
Video games based on toys